James Gray (1893 – 24 April 1917) was a Scottish professional footballer who played in the Scottish League for Dunfermline Athletic as an inside forward. He also played cricket for Dunfermline Carnegie.

Personal life 
Craig served as a sergeant in the Argyll and Sutherland Highlanders during the First World War and was killed in action in the Somme sector of the Western Front on 24 April 1917. He is commemorated on the Thiepval Memorial.

Career statistics

References 

Scottish footballers
1917 deaths
British Army personnel of World War I
British military personnel killed in World War I
1893 births
Argyll and Sutherland Highlanders soldiers
Scottish Football League players
Dunfermline Athletic F.C. players
Footballers from Dunfermline
Association football inside forwards